This is the official catalog of Whack Records. The list is ordered by release number. Original release years are within the parentheses.

Releases

See also
 Whack Records
 Sneaky Sound System
 Sneaky Sound System discography

Sneaky Sound System
Discographies of Australian record labels